María Guadalupe is a Mexican telenovela that aired on  Canal 4, Telesistema Mexicano in 1960, with episodes lasting 30 minutes. Directed by and starring Raúl Astor Luz Maria Aguilar.

Cast 
 Luz María Aguilar as María Guadalupe
 Guillermo Murray
 Alejandro Ciangherotti
 Judy Ponte
 Antonio de Hud

Production 
Original Story: Raúl Astor
Adaptation: Raúl Astor
Managing Director: Raúl Astor

References 

1960 telenovelas
Mexican telenovelas
Televisa telenovelas
Television shows set in Mexico City
1960 Mexican television series debuts
1960 Mexican television series endings
Spanish-language telenovelas